"Substitution" is a song by American indie rock band Silversun Pickups. It is the second single from the band's second studio album Swoon (2009). The song was released to American modern rock radio on September 15, 2009.

"Substitution" reached numbers 17 and 26 on Billboards Alternative Songs and Rock Songs charts, respectively.

Music video
The music video for "Substitution" was directed by The Malloys and premiered on September 15, 2009. It features models playing a game of musical chairs as the band performs the song.

In an interview prior to the video's release, the band's frontman Brian Aubert claimed: "They were actually playing musical chairs for a real prize. It got pretty ugly. Everybody in the room watching it was like, 'This is the weirdest thing.' All the girls are color-coded. In one way, it's bright and sort of silly, but the way we're looking at it is sort of depressing. In fact, I have to admit: it's by far the darkest video we've ever done."

Track listing

Charts

References

2009 songs
2009 singles
Silversun Pickups songs
Dangerbird Records singles
Music videos directed by The Malloys